Wu Yanan may refer to:

Wu Yanan (general) (born 1962), Chinese general
Wu Yanan (archer) (born 1964), Chinese Olympic archer
Wu Yanan (handballer) (born 1981), Chinese handball player
Wu Yanan (canoeist) (born 1985), Chinese sprint canoeist
Wu Yanan (wushu) (born 1986), Chinese wushu practitioner
Wu Yanan (fighter) (born 1996), Chinese mixed martial artist